The President of Cornell University is the chief administrator of Cornell University, an Ivy League institution in Ithaca, New York and New York City. Included in the list below are all Presidents of Cornell University, from the first President Andrew Dickson White through the current President, Martha E. Pollack. There have been 14 Presidents of Cornell University, not including three interregnum presidencies during university presidential transitions.

New York's only land-grant university, Cornell University was founded in 1865 by Ezra Cornell and Andrew Dickson White and has its main campus in Ithaca, New York, as well as two newer satellite medical campuses in New York City and Qatar. Cornell joined the newly formed Ivy League in 1954 and is the only land-grant institution within it.

List of presidents

See also
History of Cornell University

References

External links
Cornell University
The Cornell Presidency
Cornell President Inaugurations
Cornell Office of the President

 
Cornell
Cornell